HVG (formerly called Heti Világgazdaság, meaning Weekly World Economy) has been Hungary’s leading economic and political weekly both in terms of circulation and readership since it was founded in 1979. It is closely modeled on The Economist in style and content. 

As a regular source of news and information, HVG has a significant influence on business decision makers and other stakeholder groups. With its editorial office in Budapest, HVG provides objective information about domestic and international politics, economy and society. Capitalizing on its all-round column structure, HVG puts great emphasis on the presentation of public issues and their context, besides reporting of recent events in cultural life and news from science and technology.

HVG has an online news portal, which is available on all platforms: mobile, tablet, android and iOS applications. With its news and analyzes, HVG reaches more than 1.5 million people every week on its various print and digital platforms. 

Ever since its foundation, HVG stands for independent journalism and free expression. In April 2018, HVG launched a supportive membership program in which readers who join the HVG community can, in return for their financial support, enjoy many benefits in addition to diverse, independent and factual information.

History and profile
The magazine was very important in the years spanning the transition from communism in airing new ideas and challenging boundaries. During the same period it was also a leading investigative publication. HVG Publishing Co. was founded in 1989. In 2003, Westdeutsche Allgemeine Zeitung (WAZ) acquired 75% of the magazine. In 2014 WAZ (Funke) redeemed its majority stake, which was bought back by former HVG shareholder, management and editorial staff, and HVG was again in Hungarian hands. In response to changes in the market, digital content gained more and more importance within HVG Publishing's activities, and the product portfolio continued to expand. Apart from the weekly magazine and its specials, annexes and numerous professional or entertaining periodicals, HVG Publishing Co. has become one of the largest book publishers in Hungary, while conferences, seminars or even the largest Hungarian Job Fair continue to color the Publisher's product range.

Political and power measures in the second half of the 2010s are increasingly breathing air from market-based media companies and increasingly discouraging the survival of independent journalism. In this hostile market environment HVG's goal and mission remains to provide independent and factual information to readers. The slogan of HVG also expresses this mission while reflecting on the current situation. ’Darkness does not last forever’, along with the statement ’Let there be light’, with which HVG encourages and sympathizes with its readers, reminiscing of the first years spent in an almost ’half-illegitimacy’ under the socialist regime.

The politics that undermine independent press and the expansion of international social media and search giants (Facebook, Google) in the advertising market puts under unprecedented pressure HVG’s business model built on copy sales and advertisements. HVG has launched a Membership Program in April 2018, whereby readers who join the HVG community can enjoy many benefits in return for their financial support in addition to diverse, independent and factual information.

Some articles are also available online and in English.

HVG cover pages
HVG's iconic cover pages always work on one of the main themes of the week, mostly depicting ironic humor. In the 80's, headlines were mostly not photos, but graphics featuring suggestive hints. These covers intended to affect the sense of humor of readers sensitive to the criticism of the ruling political system. After the change of regime, cover pages became partly more concrete, and partly continued the earlier tradition.

See also

 List of magazines in Hungary

References

External links
Official website 
Official website   

1979 establishments in Hungary
Business magazines
English-language press in Hungary
Hungarian-language magazines
Political magazines published in Hungary
Weekly magazines published in Hungary
Magazines established in 1979
Magazines published in Budapest